Bohdan Arturovych Khoma (born 2 April 2003) is a Ukrainian professional footballer who plays as a goalkeeper for Dnipro-1.

Career
On 25 July 2022 he signed for Kryvbas Kryvyi Rih in Ukrainian Premier League.

References

External links
 
 

2003 births
Living people
Ukrainian footballers
Association football goalkeepers
SC Dnipro-1 players
FC Nikopol players
Ukrainian Second League players